All the Suits Began to Fall Off is an EP by American post-rock band The Mercury Program, released in 2001 on Boxcar Records.  Allmusic called it an "excessively rich and gorgeous five-song EP".

Track listing

References

2001 EPs
The Mercury Program albums